Charles Augustus Rawson (May 29, 1867September 2, 1936) was an unelected United States Senator from Iowa for nine months in 1922.

Born in Des Moines, he attended the public schools and Grinnell College. He engaged in banking and the insurance business and also in the manufacture of clay products, and was a member of the board of trustees of Grinnell. He was State chairman of the war work council of YMCA and served overseas with that organization during the First World War.

On February 17, 1922, Rawson was appointed by Governor Nathan Kendall as a Republican to the U.S. Senate to fill the vacancy caused by the resignation of William Squire Kenyon.  From the outset, it was understood that he would serve for only a short time; in announcing the appointment, Governor Kendall stated that "It is understood that Mr. Rawson will not aspire to continue in the office but will serve only until a senator can regularly be chosen." His appointment was effective on February 24, 1922, and he served until November 7, 1922, when a successor elected in the 1922 general election (Smith W. Brookhart) was qualified.

He was a member of the Republican National Committee from 1924 to 1932. He resumed the manufacture of clay products and was also interested in banking. Rawson died in Des Moines in 1936; interment was in Woodland Cemetery.

References

External links

 

1867 births
1936 deaths
Burials at Woodland Cemetery (Des Moines, Iowa)
Grinnell College alumni
Iowa Republicans
Republican Party United States senators from Iowa
YMCA leaders